= Lapentti =

Lapentti is an Italian surname. Notable people with the surname include:

- Nicolás Lapentti (born 1976), former Ecuadorian tennis player, older brother of Giovanni
- Giovanni Lapentti (born 1983), former Ecuadorian tennis player, younger brother of Nicolás
